Francisco 'Fran' José Serrano Santos (born 20 April 1995) is a Spanish footballer who plays for Algeciras CF as a central defender.

Club career
Born in Córdoba, Andalusia, Serrano was a youth product of local Córdoba CF. He made his debuts as a senior with the reserves, representing the side in both Segunda División B and Tercera División.

Serrano made his first team – and La Liga – debut on 17 May 2015, coming on as a late substitute for Rene Krhin in a 1–2 home loss against Rayo Vallecano. He was handed his first start six days later, playing the full 90 minutes in a  0–3 away loss against SD Eibar.

On 10 July 2017 Serrano moved to another reserve team, Granada CF B in the third division.

References

External links

1995 births
Living people
Spanish footballers
Footballers from Andalusia
Association football defenders
La Liga players
Segunda División B players
Tercera División players
Córdoba CF B players
Córdoba CF players
Club Recreativo Granada players
Algeciras CF footballers